Phillip Ryan DeVillier (born June 1976) is a Republican member of the Louisiana House of Representatives for District 41 in Acadia, Evangeline, and St. Landry parishes in south Louisiana. On January 11, 2016, DeVillier succeeded term-limited Democratic Representative Mickey Guillory.

In the October 24, 2015 primary election, DeVillier led a three-candidate field with 6,308 votes (55.8 percent). He defeated another Republican, former Representative Gregory L. Fruge, who polled 3,036 votes (26.9 percent), and Democrat Germaine Simpson, who finished with 1,956 votes (17.3 percent).

DeVillier was brought up in Eunice, Louisiana. A house mover from St. Landry Parish, he and his wife have three children.

References

1976 births
Living people
People from Eunice, Louisiana
Republican Party members of the Louisiana House of Representatives
Businesspeople from Louisiana
21st-century American politicians